Greg Koehler (born February 27, 1975) is a Canadian former professional ice hockey player. He played one game in the National Hockey League (NHL), with the Carolina Hurricanes during the 2000–01 season. The rest of his career, which lasted from 1998 to 2007, was spent in various minor leagues.

Biography
As a youth, Koehler played in the 1989 Quebec International Pee-Wee Hockey Tournament with the Toronro Marlboros minor ice hockey team. Ken Dryden devoted the second chapter of his 1989 book Home Game to Greg Koehler and his parents when he was the 13-year-old captain of the Marlboros. The chapter, entitled, Playing fields of Scarborough, focuses on the dreams and stresses of players and family in youth hockey.

Koehler was named to the All-Hockey East Rookie Team in the 1996–97 season. His lone game in the NHL was on December 29 with the Carolina Hurricanes during the 2000–01 NHL season.

Career statistics

Regular season and playoffs

See also
 List of players who played only one game in the NHL

References

External links
 

1975 births
Living people
Adirondack Frostbite players
Beast of New Haven players
Bloomington PrairieThunder players
Canadian expatriate ice hockey players in the United States
Canadian ice hockey centres
Carolina Hurricanes players
Chicago Hounds (ice hockey team) players
Cincinnati Cyclones (IHL) players
Elmira Jackals (UHL) players
Florida Everblades players
Lowell Lock Monsters players
Manchester Monarchs (AHL) players
Milwaukee Admirals players
Philadelphia Phantoms players
San Antonio Rampage players
Sportspeople from Scarborough, Toronto
Ice hockey people from Toronto
Syracuse Crunch players
Undrafted National Hockey League players
UMass Lowell River Hawks men's ice hockey players